Onofre Ramírez (born 5 September 1960) is a Nicaraguan boxer. He competed in the men's flyweight event at the 1980 Summer Olympics. At the 1980 Summer Olympics, he lost to Petar Lesov of Bulgaria.

References

1960 births
Living people
Nicaraguan male boxers
Olympic boxers of Nicaragua
Boxers at the 1980 Summer Olympics
Place of birth missing (living people)
Flyweight boxers